Anthony Van Wyck (May 15, 1822December 22, 1900) was an American lawyer, judge, and politician. He was a member of the Wisconsin State Senate from Kenosha County, Wisconsin.

Biography
Van Wyck was born in LaGrange, New York. He graduated from Yale Law School in 1844. In 1849, Van Wyck married Margaret Theron Skeel (March 25, 1828 - June 22, 1894). They had three children. He moved to Davenport, Iowa in 1857, and to Kenosha, Wisconsin in 1860. Van Wyck died in Milwaukee, Wisconsin in 1900, aged 77.

Career

Van Wyck was a member of the Senate from 1864 to 1865 and again from 1868 to 1869. In 1868, he was a candidate for the Republican nomination for Governor of Wisconsin, losing by one vote to incumbent Lucius Fairchild. Later, he was twice County Judge of Kenosha County, Wisconsin.

References

External links

People from Dutchess County, New York
Politicians from Davenport, Iowa
Politicians from Kenosha, Wisconsin
Wisconsin state court judges
Republican Party Wisconsin state senators
Yale Law School alumni
1822 births
1900 deaths
19th-century American politicians
19th-century American judges